Matty Nicholson (born 18 July 2003) is a professional rugby league footballer who plays as a  forward for the Warrington Wolves in the Super League.

Background
Born in Halifax, West Yorkshire, Nicholson played his amateur rugby league for Siddal.

Playing career

Wigan
Nicholson started his professional career at Wigan Warriors. He made his senior debut in 2021 on loan at Newcastle Thunder, and was loaned out again to the club at the start of the 2022 season. In May 2022, Nicholson made his Super League debut for Wigan, scoring two tries in a 22–32 defeat against Huddersfield Giants.

Warrington
In June 2022, Warrington Wolves announced the signing of Nicholson on a three-and-a-half year contract.

References

2003 births
Living people
England Knights national rugby league team players
English rugby league players
Newcastle Thunder players
Rugby league second-rows
Rugby league players from Halifax, West Yorkshire
Warrington Wolves players
Wigan Warriors players